Anolis wattsii, commonly known as Watts's anole or the Antigua Bank bush anole, is a species of anole, a lizard in the family Dactyloidae. The species is native to islands in the Caribbean Lesser Antilles.

Geographic range
Anolis wattsii is native to Antigua, and has also been introduced to Saint Lucia.

Taxonomy
Anolis pogus was formerly described as a subspecies of A. wattsii.  The taxonomy of two further subspecies, sometimes described as A. schwartzi and A. forresti, is unclear.  At a minimum, the three taxa are very closely related, and similar in appearance, ecology, and behavior.  A. w. schwartzi is found on Sint Eustatius, Saint Kitts, and Nevis.  A. w. forresti is endemic to Barbuda.

Etymology
The specific name, wattsii, is in honor of Dr. Sir Francis Watts who became the Commissioner of Agriculture for the West Indies.

References

Sources

Malhotra, Anita; Thorpe, Roger S. (1999). Reptiles and Amphibians of the Eastern Caribbean. London: Macmillan Education Ltd. . (pp. 67, 68, 71).

External links
Anolis wattsii  at the Encyclopedia of Life.
Anolis wattsii  at the Reptile Database.

Further reading
Boulenger GA (1894). "Description of a new Anolis from Antigua, West Indies". Ann. Mag. Nat. Hist., Sixth Series 14: 375-376. (Anolis wattsi, new species).
Schwartz A, Thomas R (1975). A Check-list of West Indian Amphibians and Reptiles. Carnegie Museum of Natural History Special Publication No. 1. Pittsburgh, Pennsylvania: Carnegie Museum of Natural History. 216 pp. ("Anolis wattsi [sic]", p. 107).

Anoles
Lizards of the Caribbean
Endemic fauna of Antigua and Barbuda
Reptiles of Antigua and Barbuda
Reptiles described in 1894
Taxa named by George Albert Boulenger